Ian Joseph Tansley (born 22 January 1962) is a former English cricketer.  Tansley was a right-handed batsman.  He was born in Stockport, Cheshire.

Tansley made his debut for Cheshire in the 1983 Minor Counties Championship against Buckinghamshire.  Tansley played Minor counties cricket for Cheshire from 1983 to 1990, including 47 Minor Counties Championship matches and 20 MCCA Knockout Trophy matches.  In 1985, he made his List A debut against Yorkshire in the NatWest Trophy.  He played two further List A matches for Cheshire, against Glamorgan in the 1987 NatWest Trophy and Northamptonshire, which Cheshire famously won by 1 wicket, in the 1988 NatWest Trophy.  In his three List A matches, he scored 35 runs at a batting average of 11.66, with a high score of 18.

He also played Second XI cricket for the Warwickshire Second XI and the Derbyshire Second XI.

References

External links
Ian Tansley at ESPNcricinfo
Ian Tansley at CricketArchive

1962 births
Living people
Sportspeople from Stockport
People from Cheshire
English cricketers
Cheshire cricketers